Lichtman (Jewish (Ashkenazic): occupational surname for a chandler from Yiddish likht "candle, light" + man.) is a surname. Notable people with the surname include:

 Al Lichtman (1885–1958), Hungarian-American businessman in the motion picture industry
 Allan Lichtman (born 1947), American political historian
 Cassidy Lichtman (born 1989), American volleyball player
 Charlotte Lichtman (born 1993), American ice dancer
 Igal Lichtman (died 2013), American chief executive
 Jeff W. Lichtman (born 1951), American neuroscientist
 Jeffrey Lichtman, American lawyer and talk radio host
 Judith L. Lichtman, American women's rights lawyer and human and civil rights advocate
 Rachel Lichtman, American filmmaker and music video producer
 Ronnie Lichtman (born 1950), American midwife, educator, writer and advocate for women's health

See also
 23063 Lichtman, main-belt asteroid
 Lichtman's, a defunct Canadian independent bookstore chain
 Lightman

Occupational surnames
Jewish surnames
Yiddish-language surnames